Lauren Lyle (born 12 July 1993) is a Scottish actress best known for her recurring role as Marsali MacKimmie Fraser in the Starz television drama Outlander, and peace protester Jade Antoniak in the BBC drama Vigil. Lyle also plays the leading role in the ITV crime thriller Karen Pirie.

Early life 
Lyle was born in Glasgow, Scotland. After performing at the Edinburgh Fringe for Fourth Monkey, and on stage in London in The Crucible, she was accepted to the National Youth Theatre's rep program in 2015. The highly competitive program accepts approximately fifteen or sixteen actors under the age of twenty-five who work towards a series of plays performed on London's West End in the autumn of that year.

Career 
Lyle’s first professional role was in 2014 when she starred in the critically acclaimed show The Crucible directed by Yael Farber at the Old Vic Theatre on the West End. Soon after she was cast in an episode of BBC comedy "Radges".

In 2015, Lyle was accepted to the National Youth Theatre's rep program, performing in three plays during the season. She appeared as Catherine in Wuthering Heights, Diane in Consensual, and the Prince of Arragon in Shakespeare's The Merchant of Venice.. Her first television appearance, on BBC Three's BBC Comedy Feeds, saw Lyle appearing in a series four episode entitled "Radges". 

Long-running medical drama Holby City featured Lyle as Katherine Rice in the series eighteen episode "Who You Are" (2016). From there she featured in a three-episode stint, opposite Sean Bean, in the BBC's award winning drama Broken. In 2017, Lyle debuted in the recurring role of Marsali MacKimmie Fraser in Starz's hit time travel drama Outlander, based upon Diana Gabaldon's best-selling book series of the same name. Returning to her roots at the National Youth Theatre, Lyle appeared in the television documentary Stage Direction to discuss her experiences with the program. 2018 saw a return to films for Lyle. She starred in the film adaptation of Fiona Shaw's novel Tell It to the Bees, opposite Anna Paquin and Holliday Grainger, and Lily Rose Thomas' debut short film Girls Who Drink.

In early 2020, Lyle began hosting the podcast She's a Rec'. In each episode, she interviews a female guest about the "albums, films, books and female heroes" that have had the most influence in their lives. The next year would see Lyle appear in the BBC’s crime drama Vigil. She portrayed Jade Antoniak, a peace protester and the girlfriend of Martin Compston’s character Craig Burke. The show, which is set on a ballistic missile submarine, gained over 10.2 million views in the first seven days making it the BBC’s most watched show of the year. In 2022 Lyle starred as investigator DS Pirie in ITV murder drama series Karen Pirie based upon author Val McDermid’s novel The Distant Echo.

Filmography

Film

Television

Theatre

Podcast

References

External links 
 

1993 births
Living people
21st-century Scottish actresses
Actresses from Glasgow
Scottish film actresses
Scottish television actresses
National Youth Theatre members